Hupla (also Hubla) is a Papuan language of the Indonesian province of Highland Papua, spoken by the Hubla people of Yahukimo Regency. It is similar to Lower Grand Valley Dani.

The Bible has been translated into the Hupla language.

References

Dani languages